Sadabad (also Romanized as Sa‘dābād; also known as Sa‘adābād) is a village in Fazl Rural District, in the Central District of Nishapur County, Razavi Khorasan Province, Iran. At the 2006 census, its population was 404, in 124 families.

References 

Populated places in Nishapur County